Disney's Holidays Unwrapped is a 2013 holiday album released on October 15, 2013.

Overview
The album features musical artists that were, at the time of release, associated with the Disney Channel, including Debby Ryan, Ross Lynch, Bella Thorne, Zendaya and Coco Jones. Tracks on the album are the musicians' covers of traditional and/ or popular holiday songs. Some tracks were recorded prior to the production of the album, while others were recorded specifically for it.

Track listing

Release history

References

Christmas compilation albums
2013 Christmas albums
Pop rock Christmas albums
2013 compilation albums
Teen pop compilation albums
Walt Disney Records compilation albums
Walt Disney Records Christmas albums
Albums produced by Matthew Gerrard
Disney Channel albums